The 2019–20 season was the sixth season in Kerala Blasters FC's existence, as well as their sixth season in Indian Super League.

Review and events

Indian Super League

Kerala Blasters started their 2019–20 Hero Indian Super League campaign with 2 consecutive home matches. They managed to come back for a 2–1 victory over ATK in the inaugural match, but lost against Mumbai City in very next match by conceding a late goal.

They continued their winless run after the first match, by losing their first away match of the season against Hyderabad FC after took lead and a goal less draw against Odisha FC. In this match, most of the time they played with 6 local players and only 2 foreign players because of injuries. During the international break after the match, they signed Vlatko Drobarov as a replacement for injured Jairo Rodrigues.

Kerala Blasters managed to climb to 6th position on the table after winning by their highest margin till the date of 5–1 against Hyderabad FC. They also defeated their rivals Bengaluru FC and ATK. Their last match in the season was against Odisha FC which ended in 4-4. This was the highest scoring match in the history of ISL till that date. Finally, the Blasters ended their season by finishing in 7th place in the table.

Players

First-team squad

Transfers

Transfers in

Loan return

Transfers Out

Loans out

Pre-season and friendlies

The Kerala Blasters traveled to the United Arab Emirates (UAE) for their pre-season tour ahead of the new season. There, the club was set to play friendlies with top division UAE Pro League club.

The team traveled to UAE on September 4 and played one game vs Dibba Al-Fujairah. The event organisers Michi Sports did not provide the club with proper training and other facilities in the UAE, so the club decided to pull out of the tour.

The club was scheduled to face Ajman Club on 12 September, Emirates Club on 20 September and finally Al-Nasr on the 27th. But all the three games were cancelled. The club returned to India on 11 September and had a preseason at home training facility.

Kerala Blasters restarted their preseason on their home training facility turf at the Panampilly Nagar Ground. The club faced I-League 2nd Division club South United, I-League club Real Kashmir FC and they also faced the Kerala Santhosh Trophy team, the Kerala State Football Team. The Blasters even had a preseason game against their own reserve side, the Kerala Blasters (B). They Finished their preseason with a draw against Indian Arrows.

Competitions

Indian Super League

Standings

Results summary

League Results by round

Matchday

Statistics 
As of 17 March 2020.

Squad appearances and goals

|-
! colspan=10 style=background:#dcdcdc; text-align:center| Goalkeepers

|-
! colspan=10 style=background:#dcdcdc; text-align:center| Defenders

 |-
! colspan=10 style=background:#dcdcdc; text-align:center| Midfielders

|-
! colspan=10 style=background:#dcdcdc; text-align:center| Forwards

|}

Squad statistics

Players Used: Kerala Blasters has used a total of 24 different players in all competitions.

Goalscorers

Assists
Note: This list features only the top 5 players with most assists in the season

Clean sheets

Disciplinary record

See also
 2019–20 I-League 2nd Division
 2019–20 Kerala Premier League
 2019–20 in Indian football
 2019–20 Indian Super League season
 I-League 2nd Division
 Indian Super League
 Kerala Blasters FC Reserves
 Kerala Blasters FC
 Kerala Premier League

References

External links
Official website

Kerala Blasters FC
Kerala Blasters FC seasons